Jelynn Rodriguez (born August 31, 1983) is a Filipino-American host of the American Sí TV show The Drop, as well as an actress, dancer and singer. She has worked in show business since she was a teenager attending Rancho Bernardo High School. On television, Jelynn was a host on the TV Guide Channel, and she appeared on CBS's pilot Three (2005). She also hosted the San Diego TV show, The Beat (2003-2004).  She is still a host of The Drop which can be seen on Sí TV.

In late 2005, Jelynn shot her first movie to be released sometime in 2007, Bar Starz.  She plays Melanie, one of the leads in this movie about "the adventures of some seriously odd club denizens."

Jelynn can be seen in the horror film Grizzly Park playing the character KiKi.  Grizzly Park was released in Fall 2007.

Jelynn is starring in a new Internet show called Engaged.

She can be seen in an upcoming episode of NBC's hit drama Las Vegas.

External links
www.jelynnrodriguez.net
www.grizzlypark.com
www.engaged.tv

Living people
Actresses from San Diego
American actresses of Filipino descent
American television hosts
Rancho Bernardo High School alumni
21st-century American women
1983 births